20 June 2010 Baghdad bombings were carried out by two suicide bombers outside Trade Bank of Iraq.  At least 26 people were killed and 50 people were injured when two suicide bombers drove their cars and exploded them simultaneously in front of the bank's headquarters in central Baghdad.  The two cars, each carrying  of ammonium nitrate exploded after striking the blast walls protecting the bank.

References

External links
In pictures: Iraq bombings (BBC)

2010 murders in Iraq
21st-century mass murder in Iraq
Mass murder in 2010
Suicide car and truck bombings in Iraq
Terrorist incidents in Iraq in 2010
Terrorist incidents in Baghdad
Suicide bombings in Baghdad
2010s in Baghdad
Attacks on buildings and structures in Iraq